"Today" is a song by British singer-songwriter Melanie Brown, released as the lead and only single of her sophomore album L.A. State Of Mind. The song was solely written by Brown and produced by Kevin Malpass. Released on 13 June 2005 in the United Kingdom, it entered and peaked at #41, charting for only two week. The music video was directed by Mark McConnell and filmed in Los Angeles, California. To promote the single, Brown performed the song on GMTV.

Track listings and formats
These are the formats and track listings of major single releases of "Today".

 UK CD1
 "Today" – 3:16
 "Bad, Bad Girl" – 3:25

 UK CD2
 "Today" – 3:16
 "Music of the Night (Perdido)" – 3:48
 "Today"

Charts

References

2005 singles
2005 songs
Mel B songs